Dariusz Jackiewicz (born 2 December 1973) is a Polish former professional footballer who played as a midfielder.

External links
 

1973 births
Living people
Polish footballers
Polish expatriate footballers
Expatriate footballers in Israel
Polish expatriate sportspeople in Israel
Association football midfielders
Sokół Ostróda players
Górnik Zabrze players
OKS Stomil Olsztyn players
Jeziorak Iława players
Amica Wronki players
Odra Wodzisław Śląski players
Dyskobolia Grodzisk Wielkopolski players
Zagłębie Lubin players
Ekstraklasa players
I liga players
II liga players
III liga players
IV liga players
People from Ostróda County
Sportspeople from Warmian-Masurian Voivodeship